Christian churches Ireland is a Pentecostal denomination and a part of the World Assemblies of God Fellowship, the world's largest Pentecostal denomination.

History
It was formed on October 22, 2005, when the Irish Region of the Assemblies of God of Great Britain and Ireland was allowed to join with the Irish Assemblies of God, Republic of Ireland to form the Assemblies of God Ireland.

It currently has 27 congregations throughout Ireland, in both the Republic of Ireland and Northern Ireland.

In 2016 the denomination changed its name to Christian churches Ireland

References

External links

Assemblies of God National Fellowships
Christian organizations established in 2005
All-Ireland organisations
Protestantism in Ireland
Pentecostal denominations in the United Kingdom